Cuando toca la campana (When the Bell Rings) is an Argentine television sitcom airing on Disney Channel in Latin American Countries. The series premiered on February 28, 2011. Created by Cristal Líquido Produçöes and starring  Mariana Magaña, Leonel Deluglio, Nicole Luis, Diana Santos, Jorge Blanco, Julio Graham, Gerardo Velazquez, Stephie Camarena and Eva De Dominici, the show follows the adventures of guys who try to have fun, "When the bell rings" (Cuando toca la campana) for the break. It is a Latin American adaptation based on the Disney Channel Italy series Quelli dell'intervallo.

Premise
Cuando toca la campana revolves around the adventures of the friends and enemies Barbi (Mariana Magaña), Miguel (Leonel Deluglio), Lucia (Nicole Luis), Ana (Diana Santos), Pablo (Jorge Blanco), Rodrigo (Julio Graham), DJ (Gerardo Velazquez), Naty (Stephie Camarena) and Paola (Dominici Eva), who study in the same school and try to enjoy recess, all trying to adapt themselves and their crazy adventures. Lucia waiting for the Miguel love and him waiting for her love, Barbi doing crazy things with DJ; Ana, always trying to get good grades and spending some time with Pablo, Rodrigo always fill them all with his bad luck, Natalia acting and having fun and Paola always singing.

Background
The show was produced by Disney Channel Latin America in association with Cristal Liquido Produçöes.

Cast
 Barbi, portrayed by Mariana Magaña, Barbi, is a sensible and sensitive girl. Is distracted and shy but very funny, she likes to tell illogical stories and absurd theorizing. She likes to dance a lot, a close friend of DJ, and always publish the gossip he says.
 Miguel, portrayed by Leonel Deluglio, is a great friend. Miguel is funny, charming and full of good vibes. He puts friendship before everything and likes to solve the problems of their friends. He is in love with Lucia.
 Lucia, portrayed by Nicole Luis, is the pretty and popular girl in school. Is charismatic and very practical, she likes to organize things. She is considered a leader but always worried about her appearance.
 Ana, portrayed by Diana Santos, is the smart girl at school. She's a girl who is interested in ecology and she thinks save the world.

 Pablo, portrayed by Jorge Blanco, is the most sporting guy. It is considered the best soccer player.
 Rodrigo, portrayed by Julio Graham, is a distracted and confused boy who is superstitious and very pessimistic.
 "DJ", portrayed by Gerardo Velazquez, is the school gossip, he tells everything to everybody, he loves music and dancing.
 Natalia, portrayed by Stephi Camarena, is a girl who likes the arts, like singing, dancing, acting and painting.
 Paola, portrayed by Eva De Dominici, is a singer, but very vain and only goes to school to show off that is educated and will look like any other girl.

Recurring cast
 A girl – Carla Medina

Episodes

Season 1: 2011

References

Disney Channel (Latin American TV channel) original programming
2010s Argentine comedy television series
2011 Argentine television series debuts
Spanish-language Disney Channel original programming
Spanish-language television shows
2010s high school television series
2010s teen sitcoms
Television series about teenagers